Bosporus overhead line crossings refers to the three transmission line crossings of the Bosporus, the strait in Istanbul, Turkey.

154 kV Vaniköy-Etiler 
The Bosporus overhead line crossing 1 was the first overhead transmission line crossing the Bosporus. It was inaugurated in 1957 and it is designed and operated for two 154 kV circuits.  Although apparently designed for overhead ground wires, none are currently present.
The pylons carrying this span are 113 metres tall.

Coordinates 
 Strainers West: , 
 Suspension Tower West: 
 Suspension Tower East: 
 Strainers East: ,

380 kV Anadolukavağı-Rumelikavağı

Crossing II 
Bosporus overhead line crossing 2 is the second transmission line across Bosporus. It is designed for two 420 kV circuits and it went in service in 1983.

Coordinates 
 Strainers West: , 
 Suspension Tower West: 
 Suspension Tower East: 
 Strainers East: ,

Crossing III 
Bosporus overhead line crossing 3 is the third overhead line crossing of the Bosporus. It is adjacent to the second crossing, and is designed for four 420 kV circuits, but can be used after some re-engineering work also for 800 kV lines. Since 1999, two of the four circuits are in use.

Coordinates 
 Strainer West: 
 Suspension Tower West: 
 Suspension Tower East: 
 Strainer East:

Gallery
154 kV

380 kV

See also

 List of towers
 List of spans

External links

 STFA Project
 380 kV
 Map of complete spans
 Map of Anadolu Kavağı
 Map of Rümeli Kavağı
 154 kV
 Map of Etiler
 Map of Vaniköy
 http://www.elektrikport.com/dunyanin-en-onemli-enerji-iletim-hatti-atlamalari

Electric power infrastructure in Turkey
Powerline river crossings
Bosphorus
Towers in Istanbul

de:Bosporus#Freileitungskreuzungen